The 1978 Long Beach State 49ers football team represented California State University, Long Beach during the 1978 NCAA Division I-A football season.

Cal State Long Beach competed in the Pacific Coast Athletic Association. The team was led by second year head coach Dave Currey, and played home games at Anaheim Stadium in Anaheim, California. They finished the season with a record of five wins, six losses (5–6, 1–4 PCAA).

Schedule

Team players in the NFL
No Long Beach State 49ers were selected in the 1979 NFL Draft.

The following finished their college career in 1978, were not drafted, but played in the NFL.

Notes

References

Long Beach State
Long Beach State 49ers football seasons
Long Beach State 49ers football